Bugti Hills are a range of hills in eastern Balochistan, Pakistan.  It includes the tribal tract called Bugti country.

30 million years ago the Haplorrhinies: Bugtipithecus inexpectans, Phileosimias kamali and Phileosimias brahuiorum, similar to today's lemurs, lived in rainforests on the Bugti Hills of central Pakistan.

See also
 List of fossil sites (with link directory)
 Timeline of evolution
 Timeline of human evolution

Hills of Pakistan
Cenozoic paleontological sites of Asia
Landforms of Balochistan (Pakistan)